Logghi Barogghi is the fifth album by Scorn, released on August 20, 1996 through Earache Records. The album's departure from the band's early sound eventually led to Mick Harris parting ways with Earache after its release, both sides apparently having been unhappy with how the project was being handled. After leaving Earache Records, Scorn kept pushing the dirty bass and heavy beat sound, subtly changing with each release.

Track listing

Personnel 
Anthony Burnham – photography
Mick Harris – instruments, mixing

References

External links 
 

1996 albums
Earache Records albums
Scorn (band) albums